Shiloh Walker (born 1976) is an American author of contemporary and erotic romance novels and novellas. She has written under the pen name J.C. Daniels.

Biography
Walker was born in 1976 in Louisville, Kentucky. Early in her career, Walker worked as a nurse. She began her writing career with her first works published as e-books. In 2003, her first book—a romance titled Her Best Friend's Lover—was digitally published by Ellora's Cave. Walker has self-published works under the pseudonym J.C. Daniels. Her works have been published by Berkley Publishing and Samhain.

Inspired by Bunnicula to write about vampires, Walker often writes in the paranormal romance sub-genre.

She lives with her family in the Midwest.

Bibliography 
Source:

As Shiloh Walker

Novels 
Her Best Friend's Lover (2003)
Once Upon A Midnight Blue (2004) – Also in More Than Magick
Touch Of Gypsy Fire (2004)
For the Love of Jazz (2004)
Coming in Last (2004)
Every Last Fantasy (2004) – Also in Christmas Wishes
His Christmas Cara (2004) – Also in Christmas Wishes and All She Wants
The Redeeming (2004)
No Longer Mine (2005) –  Loosely connected to Her Best Friend's Lover
Telling Tales (2005)
His Every Desire (2007)
One of the Guys (2007) – Also in Whispered Secrets
Always Yours (2007)
Love, Lies and Murder (2007)
Drastic Measures (2008)
Beautiful Girl (2008)
Vicious Vixen (2008)
Guilty Needs (2009)
One Night With You (2009)
Playing for Keeps (2009) – Also in  Lost in Love
Chains (2009)
My Lady (2009)
Djinn's Wish (2009) – Also in A Wish, a Kiss, a Dream
Never As It Seems (2010)
Beg Me (2010) – Also in Bound Temptations (2-in-1)
A Present for Christmas (2010)
Under Your Spell (2010)
Guilty Obsessions (2010)
Tempt Me (2011) – Also in Bound Temptations (2-in-1)
A Forever Kind of Love (2011) – Also in Lost in Love
Stolen (2012)
Beautiful Scars (2013)
You Own Me (2014) – Also in Branded and Deceptions: A Collection
Lacey's Game (2014)
The Virgin's Night Out (2015) – Also in Branded
Avalon (2016)
Pieces of Me (2017)
Sexy Little Secrets (2018)
Spectre (2019)
Don't Walk Away (??)

Non-fiction 

 The Untamed – Not a Parody, More like a Manual. Or a Statement: An Essay on What is and isn't Taboo in Romance (2017)

The Hunters

The FBI Psychics

The Ash Trilogy 

 If You Hear Her (2011)
 If You See Her (2012)
 If You Know Her (2012)

Rafferty 

 Fragile (2009)
 Broken (2010)

Grimm's Circle

Barnes Brothers 

 Wrecked (2013)
 Razed (2014)
 Busted (2015)
 Ruined (2016)

Secrets and Shadows

The McKays

Veil 

 Through the Veil (2008)
 Veil of Shadows (2010)

Connected

Thirty Nights with a Dirty Boy

Fated Trilogy

Whipped Cream and Handcuffs

F*ck Club

Mythe 

 Mythe & Magick (2004)
 Vampire (2004)

Cochrans of Cocker County 

 Cocksure (2018)

Make Me Believe 

 Make Me Believe (2003)
 Hearts and Wishes (2009)

Firewalkers 

 Dreamer (2004)
 Sage (2006)

Night Stalkers

Works in Collaboration With 

 The Twelve Quickies of Christmas (12 Books)
 3. Make Me Believe 
 Also in The Twelve Quickies of Christmas (1-6)
 Ex-Con
 co-authored by M.S. Parker
 Vegas Knights (5 Books) 
 0.5. Ruin Me (2017) 
 1.Unbreak Me (2017) 
 1.5 Unbind Me (2017)
 2. Risk Me  (2017)
 3. Rule You (2017) 
 co-authored by Bella Love-Wins 
 SEALionaire (3 Books)
 1. SEALionaire (2016)
 2. SEALionaire 2 (2016) 
 3. SEALionaire 3 (2016)
 co-authored by M.S. Parker
Colbana Files (11 Books)
0.5. A Stroke of Dumb Luck (2011)
7. Haunted Magic (2020)
co-author by J.C. Daniels

As J C Daniels

''A Stroke of Dumb Luck (free story, on TOR)

Colbana Files

Anthologies and collections

Notes

References

External links
Official Website 
Goodreads
jcdanielsblog.com/urban-fantasy/
Tor: A Dumb Stroke of Luck

21st-century American novelists
American romantic fiction writers
Living people
American erotica writers
American women novelists
Women erotica writers
Women romantic fiction writers
21st-century American women writers
1976 births